The Trimbelle River is a  tributary of the Mississippi River in western Wisconsin in the United States. It flows for its entire length in western Pierce County, rising in the town of Martell and flowing generally southwardly through the towns of River Falls, Trimbelle, Trenton and Diamond Bluff.

The Trembelle has been designated by the state of Wisconsin as a Class II trout stream for brown trout. Several sections of the Trimbelle have been restored by the local chapter (KIAPTUWISH) of Trout Unlimited.

See also
List of Wisconsin rivers

References

Rivers of Wisconsin
Tributaries of the Mississippi River
Rivers of Pierce County, Wisconsin